Pentalobus is a genus of beetles in the family Passalidae.

Species
 Pentalobus barbatus (Fabricius, 1801) - type species
 Pentalobus kaupi Boucher, 2005
 Pentalobus minimus Corella, 1941
 Pentalobus palinii (Percheron, 1844)
 Pentalobus savagei (Hope, 1844)

References

Further reading
Generic Guide to New World Scarab Beetles

Passalidae